Lower Birchwood is a village in Derbyshire, England. Lower Birchwood lies east of the town of Alfreton but the population is included in the civil parish of Somercotes.

References

Villages in Derbyshire
Geography of Amber Valley